Northwest hip hop is hip hop or rap music that originates from the Pacific Northwest of North America, encompassing major cities such as Portland (Oregon), Seattle (Washington), and other towns. Northwest hip hop music mixes elements from various genres of music to form a sound different from its southern neighbor, West Coast hip hop. For many years the scene existed mainly as an underground genre, but recently Northwest hip-hop has seen more and more mainstream acceptance, with artists such as Macklemore gaining nationwide attention.

Overview
Many of the local underage clubs and high schools in south Seattle held formal contests called bop-offs where dancers would compete against one another.

In the early 1980s, soldiers positioned at Tacoma's military bases provided the foundation for a growing hip-hop fan base in the Northwest. In 80s, Seattle old skool rapper "Sir Mix-A-Lot"started his career.  Fresh Tracks was a two hour show that played on Sunday nights on KKFX 1250 ("KFOX" and formerly KKDZ), and consisted of a mix of new songs and a mastermix created by Nasty Nes. These mixes were made up of songs by The World's Famous Supreme Team, Malcolm McLaren, Run-D.M.C. and many others. Due to the show's popularity, the station's producer allowed Nes to expand it to a Monday through Friday, 9pm to midnight show called NightBeat that featured prominent R&B songs as well as intermixed rap songs. As Seattle's music scene evolved, so did the Seattle breakdance and graffiti crews, including B-Boy groups like Silver Chain Gang, Circuit Breakers, and Breaking Mechanism, and graffiti writers such as Spaide, Streak, DadOne, and Spraycan. With this space there was room for an eclectic group of identities to form, however none were successful in formulating a Seattle identity. Old skool rapper Kid Sensation was from Seattle also.

History:1986-1992 
In 1986, the first radio show in Spokane to play rap and hip hop on commercial radio was “The Power Switch” on POWER 104 FM (KXVO). Hosted by TJ Collins, Collins also featured local rappers and began airing mixes by GrandMixer GMS (who was a young teenager at the time). (PROP$ Magazine article, Vol. 1, No. 2, p. 12, Dec. 1993).

Nastymix Records, the Northwest's first hip-hop label was founded with the local release of Sir Mix-A-Lot's "Square Dance Rap". Nastymix Records gained national recognition with Sir Mix-A-Lot's 1992 #1 hit"Baby Got Back"(year end chart #4). Grammy Award for Best Rap Solo Performance for "Baby Got Back." Unfortunately this award came after Nastymix's last release, Criminal Nation's 1992 album Trouble in the Hood.

1993 to 2002
Seattle hip-hop culture was confined to the only venues that would play hip-hop, all of which were in Seattle's traditionally African-American neighborhood, the Central District (referred to in Seattle as "The CD".) In 1993, Jonathon "Wordsayer" Moore of Source of Labor approached Caroline Davenport of Tasty Shows, who was responsible for booking a popular Seattle venue called RCKCNDY. In 1996 a venue called the Power Plant, 825 Western Ave, Seattle (now a Dania Furniture store 2015)became a popular venue on Saturday nights with a hip hop group called The High Children. Home for B-Boys, break-dance battles and hosted the legendary Invisible Scratch Pickles versus X-men.

Funk Daddy, Gangsta Nut, Dee Lyrious, Crooked Path, Mob Related, Self-Titld were from Seattle and Bosko, Cool Nutz, Maniak Loc & CN, Hakim& J-Mack were from Portland, Oregon. The alternative/grunge music scene soon dominated the Northwest's musical image, and in both Seattle and Portland this contributed to the troubled adolescence of local hip-hop. The Teen Dance Ordinance, which had been in effect since 1985, made it almost impossible for most Seattle venues to book all-ages shows. The social turmoil of Seattle during the late 1990s (The World Trade Organization Protest), the city's outspoken political opposition to President George W. Bush, and the despised Teen Dance Ordinance characterized the socially conscious style that defined Northwest hip-hop after 1993, a style that was continually strengthened as the hip-hop culture was attacked and labeled as violent and disruptive. However, production companies grew in NW like Winetime productions producing in the 1990s for national artist like The Click, Celly cell, E40 and more. Winetime took then midwest/local Artist Tony-O and climbed the billboard charts in 1998 and 99 peaking at #14 in Rap Singles with a song called PHD (Playa hata degree). Rap artist Tony-O is the only NW artist other than Mix A Lot until Macklemore to top the billboard charts in hip-hop at that time.

2002 to present
Rhymesayers Entertainment, Mid West record label, has signed West coast rapper Evidence.

White rapper Macklemore is a hip hop artist from the Pacific Northwest who received much national and international attention. At the 56th Annual Grammy Award, Macklemore received seven Grammy award nominations, and won four of those, including the awards for Best New Artist, Best Rap Album (The Heist), Best Rap Song and Best Rap Performance (Thrift Shop). However, Macklemore's success has been met with frustration from many local PNW hip hop artists who feel that Macklemore's status as a white, middle class male has led him to his popular position and feel disheartened that the underground artists are not better able to represent their city and region.

Ryan Lewis and Macklemore went on to self produce their first full-length album, "The Heist," released in October 2012, and earned a 2014 Grammy for Best Rap Song for their national hit, Thrift Shop, and MTV Video Music Awards for Best Hip Hop Video, Best Video with a Social Message, and Best Cinematography, for Can't Hold Us, Same Love, and Can't Hold Us, respectively.

In 2019, DJ Nasty Nes revived his classic radio show, KFOX Nightbeat, featuring songs he originally played on Fresh Tracks and Nightbeat, as well as exclusive new music (like he did on Fresh Tracks), and mastermixes by Spokane’s GrandMixer GMS. Keeping with the Sunday night tradition, KFOX Nightbeat is heard worldwide on both the TuneIn Radio and Rainier Avenue Radio apps every Sunday night from 9-11 (PST). The Beacon strives to create a safe place for the hip hop community.

The Legacy of Seattle Hip-Hop at MOHAI 
Seattle's Museum of History and Industry (MOHAI) curated and showcased an exhibit called The Legacy of Seattle Hip Hop from September 19, 2015 through May 1, 2016. This exhibit was curated by Jazmyn Scott of The Town Entertainment and Aaron Walker-Loud of Big World Breaks.

Items on display included Macklemore's fur jacket and scooter from his and Ryan Lewis' iconic "Thrift Shop" music video as well as Nasty Nes’ NASTYMIX bomber jacket. There were several different sections of the exhibit focusing on different elements of Hip Hop culture. One section was devoted to music production. It featured two mixing stations that played tracks by Vitamin D and Jake One, as well as letting visitors interact with the tracks by using the mixing boards.

Another section was dedicated to breakdancing, highlighting some of the early b-boys and b-girls in the Seattle scene as well as well-known groups like the Massive Monkees. In the middle of the floor was a raised dancing platform (Seattle Met article) and on the walls were items like a Boom Squad jersey from the group that used to perform during halftime at Seattle SuperSonics games.

See also
G funk
Gangsta rap
Funk
Miami bass

References

External links
http://www.seattle.gov/music/history.htm

American hip hop scenes
hip hop
Music of Oregon
Music of Washington (state)
Hip hop
American music-related lists
Canadian music-related lists